Cheremosh Ukrainian Dance Company (translit. Ukrayinskiy Tantsyuvalniy Ansambl "Cheremosh") is a Ukrainian dance company based in Edmonton, Alberta and a leader of Ukrainian dance in Canada .  It was founded in 1969 by Chester and Luba Kuc and named after the Cheremosh River that separates the parts of the regions of Bukovina and Galicia within Ukraine. Since 1991 Cheremosh has been under the direction of Artistic Director and Ballet Master Mykola Kanevets. Cheremosh has toured throughout Canada, the United States, Scotland, China, and most recently, a 15-day tour across four Australian cities.

History 
The Cheremosh Ukrainian Dance Company of Edmonton, Alberta, was founded in 1969 by Chester and Luba Kuc. The group began with just 19 dancers, and since then has grown to include four performing groups, a School of Dance and over 100 dancers at the various levels. Named after the Cheremosh River that separates the parts of the regions of Bukovina and Halychyna within Ukraine, the company easily matches the river's boisterousness and vivacity.

As Cheremosh's first Artistic Director, Chester Kuc's goal was to modernize Ukrainian folk dance by attempting to convey certain truths about the Ukrainian people. Using dance to make these truths dramatic and effective, he brought his dances to the stage in order to entertain audiences and further the growth of the rich Ukrainian culture in Canada.

Since its inception, Cheremosh has had five artistic directors. Following Chester Kuc, Richard Wacko, Ken Kachmar and Greg Bayda, respectively, led Cheremosh between the years of 1982 and 1991.

Currently, all performing groups train under Artistic Director and Ballet Master Mykola Kanevets, whose distinctive choreography and meticulous instruction have helped the Cheremosh Ukrainian Dance Company and its affiliates maintain a strong reputation as a successful and accomplished Ukrainian dance organization.

Past Tours 
 1977 – Sidmouth International Festival (East Devon, south England)
 1978 –
 1984 –
 1988 – Encore Cheremosh
 1993 – 25th Anniversary Tour
 1999 – New Beginnings
 2005 – Revolutions
 2007 – Journey to the Great Wall (China)
 2009 – Razom: A Fusion of Ukrainian Dance
 2010 – Aberdeen, Scotland
 2011 – Bulgaria
 2012 – Bud'mo Cheremosh
 2013 – Tour of Ukraine
 2015 – "Kaleidoscope" (U.S. tour)
 2016 – "Kaleidoscope" (Canada tour)
 2019 – Razom: Two Nations, One Spirit (Australia)

Other Achievements 
 Have performed for Heads of State, including Queen Elizabeth II and members of the Royal Family; former U.S. President Ronald Reagan, members of Congress and the Senate; Prime Minister Brian Mulroney; and Alberta Premiers Don Getty, Ralph Klein and Ed Stelmach.
 Were chosen as Canada's sole representative to the prestigious 1996 Aberdeen International Youth Festival in Aberdeen, Scotland. Performed in Aberdeen again in 2000.
 Recipients of the 1997 City of Edmonton Salute to Excellence Arts Achievement Award and the 1994 Alberta Council for the Ukrainian Arts Excellence in Artistry Award.
 Headliners at numerous festivals including Festival 88, the Vegreville Pysanka Festival, Canada's National Ukrainian Festival, Hopak in the Park, Heritage Days and Klondike Days.
 Invited to dance at Expo '74 in Spokane, Washington and Expo '86 in Vancouver, B.C.
 Produced the first Ukrainian music compact disc in the world in 1988.
 Performed at the opening ceremonies of the 2005 World Masters Games in Edmonton.

References

External links
 
 Official Cheremosh Facebook Fan Page

Ukrainian-Canadian culture in Alberta
Ukrainian diaspora in Canada
Dance companies in Canada
Performing arts in Edmonton
Folk dance companies
Performing groups established in 1969
1969 establishments in Alberta